Sacha Kalan is a village and union council (an administrative subdivision) of Mansehra District in the Khyber Pakhtunkhwa province of Pakistan. It is located in the north of the district where it borders Batagram District.

References

Union councils of Mansehra District
Populated places in Mansehra District